Han Da-kyung (born January 31, 2000) is a South Korean swimmer.

Career
She represented South Korea at the 2018 Asian Games held in Jakarta, Indonesia. She competed in the women's 800 metre freestyle and 1500 metre freestyle events and in both events she finished in 6th place. She also competed in the women's 4 × 200 metre freestyle relay event.

In 2019, she represented South Korea at the World Aquatics Championships held in Gwangju, South Korea. She competed in the women's 800 metre freestyle and women's 1500 metre freestyle events. In both events she did not advance to compete in the final.

In July 2021, she represented South Korea at the 2020 Summer Olympics held in Tokyo, Japan. She competed in the women's 400 metre freestyle, women's 800 metre freestyle, women's 1500 metre freestyle and 4 × 200 metre freestyle relay events. In the three freestyle events, she did not advance to compete in the semifinal. In the freestyle relay event, the team did not advance to compete in the final.

References

External links
 
 

Living people
2000 births
Place of birth missing (living people)
South Korean female freestyle swimmers
Swimmers at the 2018 Asian Games
Asian Games competitors for South Korea
Swimmers at the 2020 Summer Olympics
Olympic swimmers of South Korea
21st-century South Korean women